Doran Godwin (born 18 May 1944) is a British actress.

Godwin has appeared extensively on both TV and in the theatre. She is mainly known for her roles as Erica Bayliss in the TV detective series Shoestring and as Philippa Yeates in The Irish R.M., opposite Peter Bowles. She also played the title role in a BBC TV production of Emma (1972).

References

External links
 
 Doran Godwin filmography (all TV appearances) on BFI website
 Interview on Eddieshoestring.com concerning the role of Erica Bayliss

1944 births
Living people
British television actresses
20th-century British actresses
British stage actresses